The flag of the Altai Republic, in the Russian Federation, is a four stripe bicolour of light blue and white. The width of the stripes, from top to bottom, are 67+4+4+25. The white symbolizes eternity, tendency to revival, love, and the consent of the peoples within the republic. The blue symbolizes cleanliness, mountains, rivers, lakes, and heaven.

The flag was designed by artist V. P. Chukuyev. It was adopted on 2 July 1992, with the proportions of 1:2. The proportions were changed to 2:3 on 29 June 1994, 1:2 on 24 April 2003 and 2:3 on 22 March 2016.

History
In 1990, the Gorno-Altai Autonomous Oblast upgraded itself to the Gorno-Altai Soviet Socialist Republic. The next year the republic held a competition to design a new flag. Several submitted designs mimicked the Russian tricolour in variation; two depicting an enlarged blue stripe and a smaller white and red stripe. White stood for the Altai Mountains and the nobility of the people, blue for the Turkic peoples and the skies above the republic, and red for the peoples fight for freedom.

Other submissions
Other designs submitted for the flag of the Altai Republic as catalogued by the republic's Archives Committee.

References

External links

Flag
Flags of the federal subjects of Russia
Flags introduced in 1992
Altai